The Louisville Division is a railroad division operated by CSX Transportation in the U.S. states of Illinois, Indiana, Kentucky, Ohio, Tennessee, and Virginia. The Louisville Division comprises 29 subdivisions.

The subdivisions within the Louisville Division are as follows:
 Big Sandy Subdivision
 CC Subdivision
 CV Subdivision
 C&N Subdivision (note 1)
 Central Ohio Subdivision (note 1)
 Cincinnati Subdivision
 Cincinnati Terminal Subdivision
 Coal Run Subdivision
 Corbin Terminal Subdivision
 E&BV Subdivision
 EK Subdivision
 Hoosier Subdivision
 Illinois Subdivision
 Indiana Subdivision
 Indianapolis Subdivision
 LCL Subdivision
 LH&StL Subdivision
 Long Fork Subdivision
 Louisville Terminal Subdivision
 Main Line Subdivision
 Middletown Subdivision
 Midland Subdivision (note 2)
 Northern Subdivision
 Old Road Subdivision
 Richmond Subdivision
 Rockhouse Subdivision
 Russell Subdivision
 SV&E Subdivision
 Toledo Subdivision

 Note 1: This line is now operated by the Columbus and Ohio River Railroad
 Note 2: This line is now operated by the Indiana and Ohio Railway

See also
 List of CSX Transportation lines

References

CSX Transportation lines